The LTV L450F, also known as the L45ØF, was a prototype quiet reconnaissance aircraft, developed by Ling-Temco-Vought in the late 1960s for use in the Vietnam War by the United States. Based on the airframe of a Schweizer 2-32 sailplane, the aircraft flew in 1970, and was developed into the XQM-93 reconnaissance drone before the project was cancelled.

Design and development
Developed as a follow on to the Igloo White program, the L450F was intended to provide a quiet reconnaissance and communications relay aircraft. Under a $1 million USD contract by LTV Electrosystems, the L450F was developed from a Schweizer SGS 2-32 sailplane, modified by Schweizer to LTV's specifications.

These modifications included stronger wing spars, thicker wing skin, installation of a Pratt & Whitney PT6A turboprop engine driving a three-bladed propeller, and main landing gear based on that of the Grumman Ag-Cat agricultural aircraft. An alternative configuration, using a piston engine, was also proposed.

The prototype L450F first flew in February 1970, but was  destroyed during its third flight, on 23 March that year, the pilot successfully bailing out. A second prototype was then completed and flown, successfully completing the testing program, and a third prototype was ordered as the unmanned XQM-93 drone, under the Compass Dwell project. Four examples of the XQM-93 were contracted for by the United States Air Force, however the Compass Dwell project was subsequently cancelled.

Operational history

27 March 1972 Donald R. Wilson reached the altitude of 15,456 m (50,708 ft) in horizontal flight flying the remaining L450F, registered N2450F, setting a new Fédération Aéronautique Internationale international record, Class C-1c, Group II (Powered aeroplanes, takeoff weight 1000 to 1750 kg, turboprop). This record still stood as of 27 March 2012.

Specifications (prototype)

See also

References

Notes

Bibliography

 Taylor, John W.R. (ed.) Jane's All The World's Aircraft 1971–1972. London: Sampson Low Marston & Co, 1971. .

External links

L45OF
1970s United States experimental aircraft
Single-engined tractor aircraft
High-wing aircraft
Single-engined turboprop aircraft
Aircraft first flown in 1970